Blížejov is a municipality and village in Domažlice District in the Plzeň Region of the Czech Republic. It has about 1,600 inhabitants.

Administrative parts
Villages of Chotiměř, Františkov, Lštění, Malonice, Nahošice, Přívozec and Výrov are administrative parts of Blížejov.

References

Villages in Domažlice District